Sylvie Courvoisier (born 30 November 1968) is a composer, pianist and improviser.

Career
Courvoisier, originally from Lausanne, Switzerland, has lived in Brooklyn, New York for  years. She has led several groups over the years, recorded 10 albums as a band leader, and appeared in about 50 albums (25 Cds co-leader and 25 cds as a side person) for different labels, notably ECM, Tzadik and Intakt Records.

Courvoisier has performed and recorded with John Zorn, Yusef Lateef, Mark Feldman, Erik Friedlander, Joey Baron, Ellery Eskelin, Susie Ibarra, Tim Berne, Wadada Leo Smith and the flamenco dancer Israel Galvan among others.

Currently, she is the leader of her own Trio with Kenny Wollesen and Drew Gress ; co-leads the Miller's Tale QUARTET with Evan Parker, Ikue Mori and Mark Feldman; the VWCR Quartet with Ken Vandermark, Nate Wooley and Tom Rainey and Lockdown Trio with Ned Rothenberg and Julian Sartorius.
Since 1997, she performs regularly in Solo and in Duo with Mark Feldman. Since 2017, she plays in duo with Mary Halvorson. Since 2010, she has been a pianist and composer for Flamenco dancer Israel Galvan's project "La Curva". In 2018, Galvan and Courvoisier premiered "Cast-a- Net", a new project with Evan Parker, Mark Feldman, and Ikue Mori. In 2020, they premiered "La Consagracion de la primavera" with Cory Smythe, performing the Stravinky's Rite of Spring and Courvoisier's Spectro for two pianos and dance.

Courvoisier received numerous awards including the United States Artist Fellow (2020); 
a Foundation for Contemporary Arts Grants to Artist award (2018).; 
a SwissMusic Prize (2018); 
Switzerland SUISA’s Jazz Prize (2017); and 
Switzerland's Grand Prix de la Fondation Vaudoise de la Culture (2010).

Selected discography

As leader

As co-leader 
With Mark Feldman
 Music for Violin and Piano with Mark Feldman (Avant, 1999)
 To Fly to Steal – Sylvie Courvoisier-Mark Feldman Quartet with Thomas Morgan and Gerry Hemingway (Intakt 2010)
 Oblivia with Mark Feldman (Tzadik, 2010)
 Hôtel du Nord – Sylvie Courvoisier–Mark Feldman Quartet with Thomas Morgan and Gerry Hemingway (Intakt, 2011)
 Live at Theatre Vidy–Lausanne – Sylvie Courvoisier–Mark Feldman Duo (Intakt, 2013) 
 Birdies for Lulu–Sylvie Courvoisier–Mark Feldman Quartet with Scott Colley and Billy Mintz (Intakt, 2014)
 Miller's Tale–Sylvie Courvoisier–Mark Feldman - Evan Parker- Ikue Mori (Intakt, 2016)
 Time Gone Out – Sylvie Courvoisier–Mark Feldman Duo (Intakt, 2019)With Mephista (Courvoisier, Ikue Mori and Susie Ibarra) Black Narcissus (Tzadik, 2002)
 Entomological Reflections (Tzadik, 2004)With others Birds of a feather with Mark Nauseef (Unit Records, 1997)
 Lavin with Lucas Niggli (Intakt, 1999)
 Deux Pianos with Jacques Demierre (Intakt, 2000)
 Passaggio with Joelle Leandre, Susie Ibarra (Intakt, 2002)
 Alien Huddle with Ikue Mori, Lotte Anker (Intakt, 2008)
 Every So Often with Ellery Eskelin (Prime Source, 2010)
 As Soon as Possible with Courtois, Eskelin (CAM Jazz, 2010)
 Either Or And with Evan Parker (Relative Pitch Records, 2014)
 Salt Task with Chris Corsano, Nate Wooley (Relative Pitch, 2016)
 In Cahoots with Mark Feldman, Ned Rothenberg (Clean Feed, 2016)
 Crop Circles with Mary Halvorson (Relative Pitch, 2017)
 Lockdown with Ned Rothenberg, Julian Sartorius (Clean Feed, 2021)

As sidewomanWith John Zorn Cobra: John Zorn's Game Pieces Volume 2 (Tzadik, 2002)
 Masada Recital (Tzadik, 2004)
 Malphas: Book of Angels Volume 3 (Tzadik, 2006)
 Femina (Tzadik, 2009)
 Dictée/Liber Novus (Tzadik, 2010)With Erik Friedlander 50 Miniatures for Improvising Quintet (Skipstone, 2010)
 Claws and Wings (Skipstone, 2013)With Herb Robertson Real Aberration (Clean Feed, 2005)
 Elaboration (Clean Feed, 2007)With Nate Wooley' Nate Wooley Battle Piece  (Relative Pitch Records, 2015)
Nate Wooley ( trumpet), Ingrid Laubrock ( sax), Sylvie Courvoisier ( piano), Matt Moran ( vibraphone)
 Nate Wooley Battle Piece II (Relative Pitch, 2017)

External links

    
 Official web site
 List of compositions

Literature
 Rosset, Dominique: Au carrefour des mondes. La compositrice et pianiste lausannoise Sylvie Courvoisier''. Zurich 2005.

1968 births
21st-century pianists
21st-century women composers
Avant-garde pianists
ECM Records artists
Enja Records artists
Free improvisation
Intakt Records artists
Living people
Postmodern composers
Swiss jazz composers
Women jazz composers
Tzadik Records artists
Women jazz pianists
20th-century pianists
20th-century women composers
20th-century jazz composers
21st-century jazz composers
20th-century Swiss composers
21st-century Swiss composers
20th-century women pianists
21st-century women pianists